Philip "Phil" Tilker (born April 18, 1977, in Bracebridge, Ontario) is a Canadian-American curler. He was a member of Team USA at the World Men's Curling Championship in 2013 and 2018. Tilker played lead on the Brady Clark rink from 2012 to 2017, and has played in the same position on the Rich Ruohonen rink since then.

At the 2020 United States Men's Championship Tilker and Team Ruohonen earned a silver medal, losing to John Shuster in the final.

Personal life
Tilker works as a software engineer, and lives in Seattle with his wife and son. He became a naturalized American citizen in 2012.

Teams

Men's

Mixed

References

External links

Living people
1977 births
People from Bracebridge, Ontario
American male curlers
Sportspeople from Seattle
American curling champions
Canadian emigrants to the United States